Hanar may refer to:

 Amy (demon), a demon described in demonological grimoires 
 a non-playable race in the Mass Effect video game series